The Miss Arizona World competition is a beauty pageant that selects the representative for Arizona in the Miss World America pageant.

The current Miss Arizona World is Annie Zijia Li of New York City, NY.

Gallery of titleholders

Winners 
Color key

Notes to table

References

External links

Women in Arizona